Jeffrey Russell Ambroziak (born November 12, 1966) is an American cartographer, inventor, and attorney. He developed the "Ambroziak Infinite Perspective Projection," a technique for creating three-dimensional maps.

Ambroziak was born in Okinawa, Japan, and educated at
Princeton University and William and Mary Law School.  Prior
to law school, Ambroziak worked as a software engineer for Andersen Consulting and Fannie Mae. In 1997, along with his father and
brother, he founded Ambroziak Third Dimension Technologies, Inc. with
the purpose of developing geospatial visualization software.
Ambroziak co-invented the "Ambroziak Infinite Perspective Projection"
(AIPP), a map projection method used for three-dimensional stereo
visualization of geographic data.  The AIPP allows viewers to move their
viewpoint about a map while minimizing distortion, and scales the
vertical exaggeration depending on the viewer's distance from the map. Three-dimensional maps created with the AIPP have been used widely,
and were featured in a book co-authored by Ambroziak (Infinite Perspectives: Two Thousand Years of Three-Dimensional Mapmaking,
Princeton Architectural Press, 1999), and in his exhibitions at institutions
such as the Peabody Museum of Natural History.

Ambroziak is a patent attorney specializing in intellectual
property matters. He has been employed as an attorney at such companies as Walker Digital.

References

Princeton University alumni
Living people
1966 births
William & Mary Law School alumni